Kristjan Fajt (born 7 May 1982) is a Slovenian racing cyclist, who last rode for UCI Continental team . His only professional win to date came at the 2008 Tour of Qinghai Lake. He rode for Slovenia at the 2014 UCI Road World Championships.

In March 2016, Fajt recorded a positive test for erythropoietin (EPO) at the Istrian Spring Trophy. He was later given a 45-month ban in October 2016 backdated to March, with his ban expiring in January 2020.

Major results
Source:

2002
 3rd Overall GP Kranj
 9th Road race, UEC European Under-23 Road Championships
2003
 1st Overall Giro delle Regioni
1st Stage 2
 3rd  Road race, UEC European Under-23 Road Championships
 4th Gran Premio Palio del Recioto
 6th Giro del Belvedere
2004
 7th Overall Giro d'Abruzzo
2006
 1st  Time trial, National Road Championships
 4th Trofeo Internazionale Bastianelli
 4th Tour of Vojvodina
 8th Overall Giro del Friuli-Venezia Giulia
 8th Ruota d'Oro
 10th Poreč Trophy
 10th Grand Prix Kooperativa
2007
 1st Grand Prix Kooperativa
 4th Overall The Paths of King Nikola
 5th Belgrade–Banja Luka I
 10th Belgrade–Banja Luka II
2008
 1st Stage 3 Tour of Qinghai Lake
 2nd Overall The Paths of King Nikola
1st Stage 3
 2nd Schaal Sels
 3rd Tour of Vojvodina I
 10th Ljubljana–Zagreb
2009
 3rd Zagreb–Ljubljana
 6th Overall Circuit des Ardennes
 7th Prague–Karlovy Vary–Prague
2010
 8th Gran Premio di Lugano
2011
 1st Ljubljana–Zagreb
 3rd Coupe des Carpathes
2012
 1st Tour of Vojvodina I
 2nd Tour of Vojvodina II
 3rd Time trial, National Road Championships
 6th Banja Luka–Belgrade II
2013
 National Road Championships
3rd Time trial
5th Road race
 3rd Overall Tour of Al Zubarah
 3rd GP Kranj
 5th Raiffeisen Grand Prix
2014
 2nd Overall Okolo Slovenska
 2nd Overall Tour of Al Zubarah
 3rd Road race, National Road Championships
 4th Tour Bohemia
2015
 2nd Road race, National Road Championships
 4th Belgrade–Banja Luka II

See also
List of doping cases in cycling

References

External links

1982 births
Living people
Slovenian male cyclists
Doping cases in cycling
Sportspeople from Koper